Gilbert Rd/Main Street is a light rail station in Mesa, Arizona, on the Valley Metro system serving Phoenix and surrounding areas. It opened to revenue service on May 18, 2019, becoming the new terminus of the light rail line. The station has a park-and-ride facility and a bus station that is served by local routes.

The two-station  Gilbert Road Extension began construction in November 2016 and was expected to cost $184 million.

References

Valley Metro Rail stations
Railway stations in the United States opened in 2019